Montecchi Glacier is a tributary glacier that drains east from Bertalan Peak to enter Tucker Glacier just north of Mount Hazlett, in the Victory Mountains of Victoria Land, Antarctica. It was mapped by the United States Geological Survey from surveys and U.S. Navy air photos, 1960–62, and was named by the Advisory Committee on Antarctic Names for Pietrantonio Montecchi, a geophysicist at McMurdo Station in 1966–67.

References

Glaciers of Victoria Land
Borchgrevink Coast